Specialty Hospital is a community hospital in Amman,  Jordan, established in 1993 under royal patronage. A 250-bed multispecialty equipped facility, it was the first hospital to attain the BS OHSAS 18001 certification and is also the owner of several other international and national accreditations and recognitions, such as MECC award, King Abdullah II award, HCAC accreditation, ISO 9002 and ISO 9001, and more.

It features equipment and facilities including an Open MRI, a 3T MRI and 64-Slice CT Scan, 10 Operating Rooms with telemedicine capabilities, an I.V.F. Genetics Lab, 36 Royal Luxury Suites, and a Specialized Concierge Office for international patients.

Awards 
The Specialty Hospital became one of the most awarded and accredited hospitals internationally. It is accredited by The Joint Commission International (JCIA) for five cycles and accredited for five cycles by the Health Care Accreditation Council (HCAC) and, the first in Jordan and the 7th in the World to be recognized by the Joint Commission International as a Center of Excellence for Cardiac diseases specifically in Acute Myocardial Infraction and in Heart Failure.

The Specialty Hospital is the first and only hospital in Jordan to achieve the Medical Tourism Certification from MTQUA and was ranked among the top 10 hospitals in medical tourism worldwide. In 2017, 2018, and 2019, it was ranked as the 3rd best hospital worldwide in medical tourism.

The first and only hospital to achieve King Abdullah II Award for Excellence for two consecutive cycles.

See also
Health in Jordan
King Hussein Cancer Center
King Abdullah University Hospital
Medical education in Jordan
Tourism in Jordan

References

External links
Official website

Hospital buildings completed in 1993
Hospitals in Amman
Hospitals established in 1993
1993 establishments in Jordan